Ordre Nouveau may refer to:
Ordre Nouveau (1930s)
Ordre Nouveau (1940s)
Ordre Nouveau (1960s)

See also
 New Order (disambiguation)

Ordre Nouveau
it:Ordre Nouveau